Chennault International Airport  is a public aerospace/industrial complex in Lake Charles, in Calcasieu Parish, Louisiana, United States. It is governed by the Chennault International Airport Authority. The main runway is, at 10,701 feet (3,262 meters), among the longest along the Gulf Coast.

The facility is named for Claire Chennault, who commanded the Flying Tigers fighter group during World War II. It was named Louisiana's Airport of the Year in 2021.

Other features
The airfield is home to the Chennault International Airshow.

References 

 Maurer, Maurer. Air Force Combat Units Of World War II. Washington, DC: U.S. Government Printing Office 1961 (republished 1983, Office of Air Force History).
 Ravenstein, Charles A. Air Force Combat Wings Lineage and Honors Histories 1947–1977. Maxwell Air Force Base, Alabama: Office of Air Force History 1984. .

General references

External links 
 
 

Airports in Louisiana
Buildings and structures in Lake Charles, Louisiana